Angelica Ippolito (born 8 September 1944) is an Italian stage, film and television actress.

Life and career 
Born in Naples to geologist Felice Ippolito and writer and playwright Isabella Quarantotti. Her mother married thirdly to actor and playwright Eduardo De Filippo. Ippolito studied at the Silvio d’Amico Academy of Dramatic Arts in Rome and made her acting debut in the late 1960s. She worked extensively in the Eduardo De Filippo's stage company. In 1977 she won a Special David di Donatello Award for her performance in Alberto Lattuada's Oh, Serafina!. Ippolito was the last companion of the actor Gian Maria Volonté, from late 1970s until his death.

Ippolito has a son, Cody Franchetti, from her relationship with Andrea Franchetti, son of an italian baron who married a Milliken heiress. Cody was featured in the documentaries Born Rich and The One Percent.

Selected filmography 
 His Day of Glory (1969) 
 Oh, Serafina! (1976)
 Il mostro (1977)
 I Am Afraid (1977)
 Pestalozzi's Mountain (1989)
 Tre colonne in cronaca (1990)
 Guardami (1999)
 Free the Fish (2000)
 Chimera (2001)

References

External links 

Actresses from Naples
Italian stage actresses
Italian film actresses
Italian television actresses
1944 births
20th-century Italian actresses
Accademia Nazionale di Arte Drammatica Silvio D'Amico alumni
David di Donatello winners
Living people